Louisburg is the name of some places in the United States and Canada:

Louisburg, Kansas
Louisburg, Minnesota
Louisburg, Missouri
Louisburg, North Carolina
Louisburg, Wisconsin
Louisbourg, Nova Scotia (often spelled "Louisburg")

See also
Lewisburg (disambiguation)
Louisburgh (disambiguation)